, son of regent Yukiie, was a kugyō or Japanese court noble of the Edo period (1603–1868). He held a regent position sesshō in 1647. He married a daughter of second head of Echizen Domain Matsudaira Tadanao. One of the couple's daughters married regent Kujō Kaneharu who they adopted as son, and their second and fifth daughters are consorts of third head of Hiroshima Domain Asano Tsunaakira.

Family
Father: Kujō Yukiie
Mother: Toyotomi Sadako (1592–1658), daughter of Toyotomi Hidekatsu and Asai Oeyo
Wife: Matsudaira Tsuruhime (1618–1671), daughter of Matsudaira Tadanao of Fukui Domain and Tokugawa Katsuhime (daughter of Tokugawa Hidetada)
Children (all by Tsuruhime):
 Tokihime married Kujō Kaneharu
 Aihime (d. 1659) married Asano Tsunaakira
 Yasuhime (d. 1679) married Asano Tsunaakira
 Yoshihime married Jonnyo
 Umehime married Matsudaira Tsunakata

References

Fujiwara clan
Kujō family
1609 births
1647 deaths